WAPK may refer to:

 WAPK-CD, a television station in Tennessee and Virginia, USA
 the ICAO code for Benjina-Nangasuri Airport